Timothy Duke (29 October 1799 – 25 May 1858) was an English professional cricketer who played first-class cricket from 1823 to 1828.  He was mainly associated with Kent and made 5 known appearances in first-class matches.

References

1799 births
1858 deaths
English cricketers
English cricketers of 1787 to 1825
English cricketers of 1826 to 1863
Kent cricketers
People from Penshurst